The 2014 Louisiana Tech Bulldogs football team represented Louisiana Tech University in the 2014 NCAA Division I FBS football season. They were led by second-year head coach Skip Holtz and played their home games at Joe Aillet Stadium in Ruston, Louisiana. They were in their second season as a member of Conference USA, competing in the West Division. They finished the season 9–5, 7–1 in C-USA play to win the West Division title. As West Division Champions, they played East Division Champion Marshall in the C-USA Championship Game, losing to the Thundering Herd 23–26. They were invited to the Heart of Dallas Bowl where they defeated Illinois.

Schedule

Schedule Source:

Game summaries

Oklahoma

Louisiana–Lafayette

North Texas

Northwestern State

Auburn

UTEP

UTSA

Southern Miss

WKU

UAB

Old Dominion

Rice

Marshall

Illinois–Heart of Dallas Bowl

References

Louisiana Tech
Louisiana Tech Bulldogs football seasons
First Responder Bowl champion seasons
Louisiana Tech Bulldogs football